Fugaz (born April 12, 1996) is the ring name of a Mexican Luchador enmascarado, or masked professional wrestler, currently working for the Mexican Consejo Mundial de Lucha Libre (CMLL) wrestling promotion. Fugaz's real name is not a matter of public record, as is often the case with masked wrestlers in Mexico where their private lives are kept a secret from the wrestling fans. He is the son of professional wrestler El Brujo, the grandson of wrestler "Chucho Garcia" and has previously also worked under the name "Cometa".

Professional wrestling career

Championships and accomplishments
Consejo Mundial de Lucha Libre
Mexican National Tag Team Championship (1 time, current) – with Esfinge

Footnotes

References

External links
 

1996 births
Mexican male professional wrestlers
Masked wrestlers
Living people
Professional wrestlers from Jalisco
People from Guadalajara, Jalisco
Unidentified wrestlers
21st-century professional wrestlers
Mexican National Tag Team Champions